Charles Albert "Joe" Green (July 26, 1878 – September 18, 1962) was an American baseball outfielder and manager in the pre-Negro leagues and the beginning of the Negro National League.

Green began his baseball career with the Chicago Clippers in 1900.

In 1903, he played for the Columbia Giants, then the Chicago Union Giants, the Leland Giants, then spent most of the rest of his playing career for the Chicago Giants where he also managed the team. He took over the team after Frank Leland died on November 14, 1914.

Later in his life, Green put his own name on the team, calling them "Joe Green's Chicago Giants," a team typically made up of popular ex-players of the Negro leagues and pre-Negro leagues.

References

External links
 and Baseball-Reference Black Baseball stats and Seamheads
  and Seamheads

Chicago Giants players
Leland Giants players
Negro league baseball managers
1878 births
1962 deaths
Baseball players from Chicago
20th-century African-American people
Baseball outfielders